Weatherby is an unincorporated community in Baker County, Oregon, United States.

There was a post office named Express Ranch established in 1865 near what is now Durkee during the gold mining boom in the county. C. W. Durkee was the first postmaster. It was so-named because it was a stopover for stagecoaches or "expresses", while the term "ranch" in this case probably came from the Spanish rancho, a term for a place of lodging popular with the miners who had gone there from California. It had nothing to do with the pursuit of ranching. In 1884, the Oregon Railway and Navigation Company established a Weatherby station on its line to Huntington. Weatherby post office closed in 1920. Meanwhile, an office was reestablished at the Express Ranch site in 1884 and named Express. The name of that office was changed to Durkee around 1902.

Weatherby is the site of an Oregon Department of Transportation rest area. There was formerly a state historic park north of Weatherby called Rattlesnake Springs that commemorated a stop along the Oregon Trail. It was displaced by the construction of I-84.

During the August 21, 2017 solar eclipse, an estimated 300 cars were parked at the Weatherby rest area on I-84 while visitors observed the event. The path of totality intersected with I-84 at Weatherby.

References

External links
Roadcam at Weatherby rest area on I-84 from Oregon Department of Transportation
Images of historic markers at Weatherby rest area from Flickr, including image of Rattlesnake Springs plaque
Images of Weatherby from Flickr

Unincorporated communities in Baker County, Oregon
1865 establishments in Oregon
Populated places established in 1865
Unincorporated communities in Oregon